Mesinee "May" Mangkalakiri (born April 21, 1983 in Los Alamitos, California) is an American badminton player of Thai descent. She won a bronze medal, along with her partner Raju Rai, in the mixed doubles at the 2003 Pan American Games in Santo Domingo, Dominican Republic. She repeated her bronze medal performance with her new partner Bob Malaythong in the mixed doubles, and also, beat Canada's Fiona McKee and Charmaine Reid for the gold in the women's doubles at the 2007 Pan American Games in Rio de Janeiro, Brazil. Mangkalakiri is also a member of Orange County Badminton Club in Anaheim, California, and is coached and trained by former Olympic doubles champion  Tony Gunawan (2000), who is currently playing for the United States.

Mangkalakiri qualified for the women's doubles at the 2008 Summer Olympics in Beijing, by placing fourteenth and receiving an allocated entry from the Badminton World Federation's ranking list. Mangkalakiri and her partner and former high school teammate Eva Lee, however, lost the preliminary round match to the Singaporean pair Jiang Yanmei and Li Yujia, with a score of 12–21 each in two straight periods.

Achievements

Pan American Games
Women's doubles

Mixed doubles

Pan Am Championships
Women's doubles

Mixed doubles

IBF World Grand Prix
The World Badminton Grand Prix sanctioned by International Badminton Federation (IBF) since 1983.

Mixed doubles

BWF International Challenge/Series
Women's singles

Women's doubles

Mixed doubles

 BWF International Challenge tournament
 BWF International Series tournament

References

External links

NBC 2008 Olympics profile

1983 births
Living people
American sportspeople of Thai descent
People from Los Alamitos, California
People from Garden Grove, California
Sportspeople from California
American female badminton players
Olympic badminton players of the United States
Badminton players at the 2008 Summer Olympics
Badminton players at the 2003 Pan American Games
Badminton players at the 2007 Pan American Games
Pan American Games gold medalists for the United States
Pan American Games bronze medalists for the United States
Pan American Games medalists in badminton
Medalists at the 2003 Pan American Games
Medalists at the 2007 Pan American Games
21st-century American women